Diandra Hyman Asbaty (born August 2, 1980 in Oak Lawn, Illinois) is an American bowler who represented Team USA for fifteen years and was United States Amateur Champion in 1999 and 2006. She is also an official youth bowling spokesperson for the United States Bowling Congress (USBC). She competed in the PBA Women's Series from 2007 to 2010, winning two titles in that span. She also won the 2012 USBC Queens major tournament and continues to compete in PWBA tournaments. Asbaty has been elected to the USBC Hall of Fame.

Asbaty is a pro staff member for Storm Bowling.

Personal
Asbaty started bowling at age 5 with her older sister, Kassy. Kassy Hyman would go on to bowl for Wichita State University. Diandra graduated from the University of Nebraska with a bachelor's degree in journalism. She lives in Chicago, Illinois, with her husband, John, son Madden and daughter Jersey.

Bowling career
Diandra owns two PBA Women’s Series titles, one in singles (2007) and one in mixed doubles (2010). The latter event accounted for the 25th and final PBA Tour title for Asbaty's partner, PBA Hall of Famer Brian Voss.

Diandra owns two PWBA Tour titles. She won the 2012 USBC Queens major championship and the 2022 Striking Against Breast Cancer Mixed Doubles (with partner E. J. Tackett).

She has also earned over 60 international medals.

In November, 2022, Asbaty was elected to the USBC Hall of Fame, Performance category. She will be inducted on April 26, 2023.

Accomplishments

International
 2012 Australian Masters champion
 Bowling World Cup champion 2006 AMF World Cup
 2004 and 2007 World Ranking Masters champion
 Silver medal at 2004 WTBA World Tenpin Team Cup
 Gold, bronze and two silver medals at 2003 FIQ World Championships
 Bronze medal at 2003 FIQ World Tenpin Team Cup
 Four gold medals and one bronze at 2002 Tournament of the Americas
 4th at 2002 British Open
 4th at 2002 World Ranking Masters
 Four gold medals and one silver at 2001 Tournament of the Americas
 2001 Junior World Team Challenge champion
 Gold medal at 2000 FIQ World Tenpin Team Cup
 One gold medal, two silver and one bronze at 2000 Junior World Championships
 Four gold medals at 1999 Tournament of the Americas
 Two gold medals at 1997 FIQ American Zone Youth Championships

National
 Winner at 2012 USBC Queens
 7th at 2005 USA Bowling National Amateur Championships
 10th at 2004 USA Bowling National Amateur Championships
 8th at 2003 USA Bowling National Amateur Championships
 5th at 2001 USA Bowling National Amateur Championships
 7th at 2000 USA Bowling National Amateur Championships
 1999 and 2006 U.S. Amateur champion
 7th at 1998 USA Bowling National Amateur Championships
 2nd at 2000 USA Junior Gold Bowling National Championships
 6th at 2001 USA Junior Gold Bowling National Championships
 Member of 1999 and 2001 Intercollegiate Bowling Championships winner (Nebraska)

State/Local
1998 Indiana Junior Queens champion (Muncie, Indiana)

1998 Indiana State Female Youth Bowler of the Year

Professional
 Champion at 2007 PBA Women's Series Great Lakes Classic
 Champion at 2010 PBA Don and Paula Carter Mixed Doubles (with Brian Voss)
 Champion at 2012 USBC Queens
 Champion at 2022 Storm Striking Against Breast Cancer Mixed Doubles (with E. J. Tackett)

Awards
 Bowlers Journal 1st Team All-American, 2010
 World Bowling Writers Bowler of the Year, 2007
 Bowlers Journal Bowler of the Year, 2007
 Bowling Writers Amateur Bowler of the Year, 2003, 2006, 2007
 Bowlers Journal Bowler of the Year, 2006
 World Bowling Writers World Bowler of the Year, 2006
 Inducted into the World Bowling Writer’s Hall of Fame, 2005
 Mid-America Bowler of the Year, 1999, 2000, 2001, 2003, 2005
 Bowlers Journal International 1st Team All American, 2005
 Bowlers Journal International Amateur Bowler of the Year, 2000, 2001, 2003
 United States Olympic Committee “Athlete of the Year”- Bowling, 2003
 United States Olympic Committee Nominee “Sportswoman of the Year,” 2003
 University of Nebraska Student Athlete of the Year, 2002
 United States Olympic Committee “Athlete of the Year”- Bowling, 2000
 National Collegiate Bowling Coaches Association - Player of the Year, 2000
 National Collegiate Bowling Coaches Association - First Team All- American, 2000
 Bowling Digest Magazine Collegiate Bowler of the Year, 2000
 Alberta E. Crowe Star of Tomorrow, 1998

In the media
Diandra was the laneside reporter for ESPN's broadcasts of the PBA Team Challenge in July, 2008.

External links

KaizenByDiandra - New Site
Official Website - OLD
 Industry profile of Diandra Asbaty
Team USA's Homepage
Asbaty is elected to World Bowling Writers Hall of Fame
Asbaty Wins the 2006 U.S. Amateur Championship
Asbaty Strikes Down Bowling Stereotypes
Diandra Asbaty Bowling YouTube Video's!!!

References

American ten-pin bowling players
Bowlers at the 2007 Pan American Games
1980 births
Living people
Pan American Games medalists in bowling
Pan American Games gold medalists for the United States
Medalists at the 2007 Pan American Games